The 1948 NCAA Men's Ice Hockey Tournament was the culmination of the 1947–48 NCAA men's ice hockey season, the 1st such tournament in NCAA history. It was held between March 18 and 20, 1948, and concluded with Michigan defeating Dartmouth 8-4. All games were played at the Broadmoor Ice Palace in Colorado Springs, Colorado.

This inaugural tournament possesses two distinctions beyond being the first of its kind: it was the championship with the fewest games played (3) with all succeeding tournaments having a minimum of 4 games. Additionally, the overtime rules used were not sudden-death, allowing Michigan to score multiple times in the first overtime game in tournament history (the next overtime game would not happen until 1954).

Qualifying teams
Four teams qualified for the tournament, two each from the eastern and western regions. The teams were selected by a committee based upon both their overall record and the strength of their opponents.

Format
The eastern and western teams judged as better were seeded as the top regional teams. The second eastern seed was slotted to play the top western seed and vice versa. All games were played at the Broadmoor Ice Palace. All matches were Single-game eliminations with the semifinal winners advancing to the national championship game.

Bracket

Note: * denotes overtime period(s)

Results

Semifinals

Dartmouth vs. Colorado College

Michigan vs. Boston College

National Championship

Michigan vs. Dartmouth

All-Tournament Team

First Team
G: Bernie Burke (Boston College)
D: Connie Hill (Michigan)
D: Ron Newson (Colorado College)
F: Wally Grant (Michigan)
F: Bill Riley (Dartmouth)
F: Joe Riley* (Dartmouth)
* Most Outstanding Player(s)

Second Team
G: Dick Desmond (Dartmouth)
D: Ross Smith (Michigan)
D: Ed Songin (Boston College)
F: Wally Gacek (Michigan)
F: Bruce Stewart (Colorado College)
F: Joe Slattery (Colorado College)

References

Tournament
NCAA Division I men's ice hockey tournament
NCAA Men's Ice Hockey Tournament
NCAA Men's Ice Hockey Tournament
1940s in Colorado Springs, Colorado
Ice hockey competitions in Colorado Springs, Colorado